Ettore Boiardi (October 22, 1897 – June 21, 1985), also known by the Anglicized name Hector Boyardee, was an Italian-American chef, famous for his eponymous brand of food products, named Chef Boyardee.

Early life
Boiardi was born in Piacenza, Italy, in 1897, to Giuseppe and Maria Maffi Boiardi. At the age of 11, he was working as an apprentice chef at local restaurant "La Croce Bianca", although his duties were confined to non-cooking odd jobs such as potato peeling and dealing with the trash. He later learned more restaurant skills as an immigrant in Paris and London. 

On May 9, 1914, at the age of 16, he arrived at Ellis Island aboard La Lorraine, a ship of French registration.

Career
Boiardi followed his brother Paolo to the kitchen of the Plaza Hotel in New York City, working his way up to head chef. He supervised the preparation of the homecoming meal served by Woodrow Wilson at the White House for 2,000 returning World War I soldiers. His entrepreneurial skill became polished and well known when he opened his first restaurant, Il Giardino d'Italia, whose name translates as "The Garden of Italy", at East 9th Street and Woodland Avenue in Cleveland, in 1924. The patrons of Il Giardino d'Italia frequently asked for samples and recipes of his spaghetti sauce, so he filled cleaned milk bottles.

In 1927, Boiardi met Maurice and Eva Weiner who were patrons of his restaurant and owners of a local self-service grocery store chain.  The Weiners helped the Boiardi brothers develop a process for canning the food at scale.  They also procured distribution across the United States through their grocery's wholesale partners. Boiardi's product was soon being stocked in markets nationwide – the company had to open a factory in 1928 to meet the demands of national distribution. After sauce, their next product was closer to a complete pasta meal, including a canister of grated Parmesan cheese, a box of spaghetti, and a jar of pasta sauce, held together in cellophane plastic wrap. Already then, the company was the largest importer of Italian Parmesan cheese, while also buying tons of olive oil, according to grandniece Anna Boiardi. Touting the low cost of spaghetti products as a good choice to serve to the entire family, Boiardi introduced his product to the public in 1929. In 1938, production was moved to Milton, Pennsylvania, where they could grow enough tomatoes to serve the factory's needs, which reached 20,000 tons of tomatoes per season at peak production; they also began growing their own mushrooms on location in the plant. Boiardi sold his products under the brand name "Chef Boy-Ar-Dee" because non-Italians could not manage the pronunciation, including his own salesforce.

For producing rations supplying Allied troops during World War II, he was awarded a Gold Star order of excellence from the United States War Department.

After struggling with cash flow, compounded by internal family struggles over the ownership and direction of the company in managing rapid internal growth, he sold his brand to American Home Foods, later International Home Foods.

Boiardi appeared in many print advertisements and television commercials for his brand in the 1940s through the 1960s. His last appearance  in a television commercial promoting the brand aired in 1979. Boiardi continued developing new Italian food products for the American market until his death in 1985.

Personal life
He is the great uncle of American author Anna Boiardi, who wrote Delicious Memories: Recipes and Stories from the Chef Boyardee Family.

Death
Boiardi died of natural causes on June 21, 1985, at age 87 in a nursing home in Parma, Ohio, survived by his wife Helen J. Boiardi, who died in 1995, and son Mario, who died in 2007. He had five grandchildren. He is buried at All Souls Cemetery in Chardon Township, Ohio.

Legacy
In June 2000, ConAgra Foods acquired International Home Foods. The company continues to use his likeness on Chef Boyardee-brand products, which are still made in Milton, Pennsylvania.

References

Further reading
Bellamy, Gail Ghetia (2003). Cleveland Food Memories. Cleveland, OH: Gray & Company, Publishers.

External links
 Boiardi, Hector, Encyclopedia of Cleveland History
 The Man, The Can: Recipes Of The Real Chef Boyardee, NPR.org
 
 

1897 births
1985 deaths
American male chefs
American chefs
American food industry businesspeople
American restaurateurs
Italian chefs
Italian emigrants to the United States
People from Parma, Ohio
People from Piacenza